Aimwell is an unincorporated community in Marengo County, Alabama, United States. Aimwell had a post office at one time, but it no longer exists.

Geography

Demographics
According to the returns from 1850-2010 for Alabama, it has never reported a population figure separately on the U.S. Census.

References

Unincorporated communities in Alabama
Unincorporated communities in Marengo County, Alabama